Bupleurum sintenisii is a species of flowering plant in the family Apiaceae. It is referred to by the common name dwarf hare's ear, and is an annual herb, 1–5 cm high, hairless and glaucous. Leaves alternate, simple, entire, linear, 10-20 x 0.5-1.5 mm. The inconspicuous flowers are yellowish to brownish and crowded in umbels. Flowers from May to July. The fruit is a dry schizocarp, covered by hooded bristles.

Habitat
It grows in dry rocky sites with sparse garigue vegetation at 100–200 m altitude.

Distribution
It is endemic to Cyprus where it occurs around Nicosia  (Athalassa) and the area Pergamos-Troulli. It has also been recorded in the Akhna area.

References

 The Endemic Plants of Cyprus, Texts: Takis Ch. Tsintides, Photographs: Laizos Kourtellarides, Cyprus Association of Professional Foresters, Bank of Cyprus Group, Nicosia 1998,

External links
http://www.natureofcyprus.org/detailinfo.aspx?cid=5&recid=208&rowid=54&rowcount=4&pageindex=10&pagesize=5
http://www.theplantlist.org/tpl/record/kew-2687168

sintenisii
Endemic flora of Cyprus
Taxa named by Paul Friedrich August Ascherson
Taxa named by Ignatz Urban
Taxa named by Rupert Huter